Spongilidae is a family of sponges that live in freshwater lakes and rivers.  The following genera are recognized in the family:
 Anheteromeyenia Schröder, 1927
 Corvoheteromeyenia Ezcurra de Drago, 1979
 Corvospongilla Annandale, 1911
 Dosilia Gray, 1867
 Duosclera Reiswig & Ricciardi, 1993
 Ephydatia Lamouroux, 1816
 Eunapius Gray, 1867
 Heteromeyenia Potts, 1881
 Heterorotula Penney & Racek, 1968
 Nudospongilla Annandale, 1918
 Pachyrotula Volkmer-Ribeiro & Rützler, 1997
 Pectispongilla Annandale, 1909
 Pottsiela Volkmer-Ribeiro, Souza-Machado, Furstenau-Oliveira, Vieira-Soares, 2010
 Racekiela Bass & Volkmer-Ribeiro, 1998
 Radiospongilla Penney & Racek, 1968
 Sanidastra Volkmer-Ribeiro & Watanabe, 1983
 Saturnospongilla Volkmer-Ribeiro, 1976
 Spongilla Lamarck, 1816
 Stratospongilla Annandale, 1909
 Trochospongilla Vejdovsky, 1888
 Umborotula Penney & Racek, 1968
 Uruguayella Bonetto & Ezcurra de Drago, 1969

References